This pinyin table is a complete listing of all Hanyu Pinyin syllables used in Standard Chinese. Each syllable in a cell is composed of an initial (columns) and a final (rows). An empty cell indicates that the corresponding syllable does not exist in Standard Chinese.

The below table indicates possible combinations of initials and finals in Standard Chinese, but does not indicate tones, which are equally important to the proper pronunciation of Chinese.  Although some initial-final combinations have some syllables using each of the five different tones, most do not.  Some utilize only one tone.

Pinyin entries in this page can be compared to syllables using the (unromanized) Zhuyin phonetic system in the Zhuyin table page.

Finals are grouped into subsets a, i, u and ü.

i, u and ü groupings indicate a combination of those finals with finals from Group a. For example:

Most syllables are a combination of an initial and a final.  However, some syllables have no initials.  This is shown in Pinyin as follows:
if the syllable begins with an i, it is replaced with a y
if the syllable begins with an u, it is replaced with a w
if the syllable begins with an ü, it is replaced with yu
exceptions to the rules above are indicated by yellow in the table's no initial column:

Note that the y, w, and yu replacements above do not change the pronunciation of the final in the final-only syllable. They are used to avoid ambiguity when writing words in pinyin.  For example, instead of:
"uen" and "ian" forming "uenian", which could be interpreted as:
"uen-ian"
"uen-i-an" or
"u-en-i-an"
the syllables are written "wen" and "yan" which results in the more distinct "wenyan"

There are discrepancies between the Bopomofo tables and the pinyin table due to some minor differences between the Mainland standard, putonghua, and the Taiwanese standard, guoyu, in the standard readings of characters. For example, the variant sounds  (ruá),  (dèn),  (tēi) are not used in guoyu. Likewise the variant sound  (lüán) is not recognized in putonghua, or it is folded into (luán). A few readings reflect a Standard Chinese approximation of a regionalism that is otherwise never encountered in either putonghua or guoyu.

Overall table 
Syllables in italics are considered nonstandard, and only exist in the form of regionalisms, neologisms or slang.

Color Legend:
{|class=wikitable
|width=200 style="background:#EAECF0;" | "regular" initial or final
Final is in Group a or is a direct combination of:
i+Group a final
u+Group a final
ü+Group a final
|width=200 style="background:#CCCCCC;" | Final of i, u, ü groups is a modified combination of:
i+Group a final
u+Group a final
ü+Group a final
|width=200| syllable is direct combination of initial and final (or follows rules for no-initial syllables outlined at the top of the page)
|width=200 style="background:#FFFFCC;" | syllable is modified combination of initial and final 
|}

There are also a very small number of syllables consisting only of consonants: m (呣), n (嗯), ng (嗯), hm (噷), hng (哼).

Ér (/) contraction
A few additional syllables are formed in pinyin by combining an initial-final combination from the table above with an additional er-final.  Rather than two distinct syllables, the last "er" is contracted with the first combination, and therefore represented as one syllable (analogous to "they're"  instead of "they are", and "isn't" instead of "is not" in English). This is called "erhua" in Chinese.
Attention: this is not a full table of all existing syllables of erhua. Instead, this is a presentation of pinyin's erhua forming.

See also 
Wade–Giles table
Palladius table
Zhuyin table
Cyrillization of Chinese
Comparison of Chinese transcription systems

Notes

External links 
Standard Mandarin Pinyin Table The complete listing of all Pinyin syllables used in Standard Chinese, along with native speaker pronunciation for each syllable.
Pinyin table Pinyin table, syllables are pronounced in all four tones.
Pinyin Chart for Web Pinyin Chart for Web, every available tones in the Chinese language included.
Pinyin Chart for iPad Pinyin Chart app for iPad, every available tone in the Chinese language included.
Pinyin Chart for iPhone Pinyin Chart app for iPhone, every available tones in the Chinese language included.
Pinyin Table for Android Pinyin Table for Android, every available tones in the Chinese language included.

Romanization of Chinese
Mandarin words and phrases
Pinyin